Chinophrys is a genus of jumping spiders that was first described by J. X. Zhang & Wayne Paul Maddison in 2012.

Species
 there are six species recognised, found in China, Taiwan and South Africa:
Chinophrys liujiapingensis (Yang & Tang, 1997) – China
Chinophrys mengyangensis Cao & Li, 2016 – China
Chinophrys pengi Zhang & Maddison, 2012 (type) – China
Chinophrys taiwanensis (Peng & Li, 2002) – Taiwan 
Chinophrys trifasciata Wesolowska, Azarkina & Russell-Smith, 2014 – South Africa
Chinophrys wuae (Peng, Tso & Li, 2002) – Taiwan

References

Salticidae genera
Salticidae
Spiders of China
Spiders of South Africa